Omega: The Last Days of the World is a science fiction novel published in 1894 by Camille Flammarion.

In the 25th century, a comet made mostly of Carbonic-Oxide (CO) could possibly collide with the Earth. The novel is concerned with the philosophy and political consequences of the end of the world.

Film version
In 1931, French director Abel Gance released his film adaptation of La Fin du monde, known in English as End of the World.

References

External links
 
 

1894 French novels
Apocalyptic novels
1894 science fiction novels
Fiction about comets
French novels adapted into films
Novels set in the 25th century